Aleksandra Evgenievna Yakovleva (born Aleksandra Evgenievna Ivanes, ; 2 July 1957 – 1 April 2022) was a Soviet and Russian actress and businesswoman (transportation industry - Air and Rail). She was one of the most popular actresses in 1980s.

Biography

Aleksandra Evgenievna Ivanes was born on 2 July 1957 in the city of Kaliningrad. She derived her stage name Aleksandra Yakovleva from the surname of her maternal grandfather. As a child she was taught dancing; she later studied violin at a music school. In 1978 she graduated from the Leningrad State Institute of Theatre, Music and Cinema. In the Soviet disaster film Air Crew (1979), she performed with Leonid Filatov the first erotic scene in a mainstream domestic Soviet film. During the 1980s, she became one of the most popular actresses of Cinema of the Soviet Union. In 1993 she left the cinema and until 1997 was the chairman of the committee on culture and tourism of the city of Kaliningrad.

From 1997 she served as Head of quality management and staff service at Airport Pulkovo and then as deputy chief of management and marketing on the October Railway. She took part in December 2009 launch of the high-speed "Sapsan" trains on the route Moscow - St. Petersburg. At her initiative, a coach with a restaurant and a bar were included in the service. Later, she held the position of Deputy Director General of the Directorate-speed communications of JSC "Russian Railways" (KL net).

Having returned to the area on 7 June 2012, she was elected chairman of the Kaliningrad regional branch of the Russian political party "Yabloko". In April 2016,  Yakovleva returned to acting with the St. Petersburg Maly Theatre Comedy in a leading role as "Bernadette", the maid. The remake of Flight Crew was released in 2017, repeating the name and the main theme of the 1979 film. Aleksandra Yakovleva played Tamara again - now a big official in the world of aviation.

Selected filmography
1979 Air Crew (Экипаж) as Tamara
1982 Charodei (Чародеи) as Alyona
1982 Tears Were Falling (Слёзы капали) as Lyusya
1984 Skydivers (Парашютисты) as Zinaida Gostilova
1985 Start All Over Again (Начни сначала) as Lera
1986 Forgive Me (Прости меня) as Natasha
1987 A Man from the Boulevard des Capucines (Человек с бульвара Капуцинов) as Ms. Diana Little
1988 Bright Personality (Светлая личность) as Rita Haritullina
2016 Flight Crew (Экипаж) as Tamara

References

External links
 

1957 births
2022 deaths 
Deaths from breast cancer 
Deaths from cancer in Russia
People from Kaliningrad
Russian film actresses
Soviet film actresses
Soviet television actresses
Russian State Institute of Performing Arts alumni
Yabloko politicians
Russian people in rail transport